The 77th running of the Tour of Flanders cycling race in Belgium was held on Sunday 4 April 1993. 

It was the second leg of the 1993 UCI Road World Cup. Belgian Johan Museeuw won his first Tour of Flanders in a two-man sprint against Frans Maassen. The race started in Sint-Niklaas and finished in Meerbeke (Ninove).

Race Summary
At 68 km from the finish, eight riders broke away, with twofold winner Edwig Van Hooydonck and Belgian national champion Johan Museeuw at the front. Museeuw attacked on Tenbosse climb, followed by Dutchman Frans Maassen. Maassen, considered the slower sprinter, refused to work after the Muur van Geraardsbergen. Museeuw and Maassen stayed ahead, with Museeuw controlling the sprint and taking his first win in the World Cup race. Dario Bottaro won the sprint for third.

Climbs
There were 16 categorized climbs:

Results

References

External links
 Recap of the race (Flemish television)
 

Tour of Flanders
Tour of Flanders
Tour of Flanders
Tour Of Flanders
April 1993 sports events in Europe